Kennedy Town Terminus is a tram stop and one of the seven termini of Hong Kong Tramways, a double-decker tram system. Located in Kennedy Town, it is the system's westernmost terminus, and one of its three termini in the Central and Western District on Hong Kong Island.

Routes
Kennedy Town ↔ Happy Valley
Kennedy Town ↔ Shau Kei Wan

References

Hong Kong Tramways stops